The Battle of Mang Yang Pass (also known as the Battle of An Khê or the Battle of Đắk Pơ) was one of the last battles of the First Indochina War which took place on 24 June 1954. The battle was one of the bloodiest defeats of the French Union forces, along with the battle of Dien Bien Phu shortly beforehand.

Background

Groupement Mobile No. 100 ("Group Mobile 100" or G.M. 100) was a regimental task force unit of the French Far East Expeditionary Corps which was assembled as a convoy. It included the elite veteran UN Bataillon de Corée who fought in the Korean War at Chipyong-ni, Wonju and Heartbreak Ridge. Anxious to avoid a second disaster like the siege at Dien Bien Phu, the French Chief of Staff ordered G.M. 100 to abandon their isolated position in the Central Highlands. This was code named opération Églantine.

Ambush
At the road marker 'Kilometer 15' the column was ambushed by Việt Minh troops belonging to the 803rd Regiment and suffered heavy losses. The remains of G.M. 100 managed to break through the ambush. The remnants of G.M. 100, now with G.M. 42 and the 1st Airborne Group, had to drive through  of Viet Minh controlled road. The column was ambushed again on June 28 and 29 at Dak Ya-Ayun by the Việt Minh 108th Regiment, suffering heavy losses. The survivors finally reached Pleiku the following day.

In five days of fighting, G.M. 100 lost 85 percent of its vehicles, 100 percent of its artillery, 68 percent of its signal equipment and 50 percent of its crew-served weapons. The Headquarters Company had only 84 men left out of an original 222. The 43rd Colonial, the 1st and the 2nd Korea Battalion which numbered about 834 men each, was now mustered at roll call with 452, 497, and 345 men respectively. The 2nd Group of the 10th Colonial Artillery, reduced to fighting as infantry after the loss of all of their guns, had shrunk from 475 men to 215 men during the fighting. Colonel Barrou and several men were taken as prisoners of war. The Việt Minh 96th Regiment suffered more than 100 killed in comparison.

Aftermath
On June 29, the remains of 1st Korea Battalion was ordered to take part in Operation Myosotis to open Route Coloniale 14 between Pleiku and Ban Mê Thuột which was over 96 kilometers away. On July 17, the column was ambushed at Chu Dreh Pass by local units of the Việt Minh 96th Regiment. When the survivors finally arrived at Ban Mê Thuột the following day, there were only 107 men remaining out of 452, of those 53 were wounded, in addition a further 47 vehicles were lost.

The ambush and destruction of GM 100 was considered the last significant battle of the First Indochina War. Three days after the ambush at Chu-Dreh a battlefield ceasefire was announced when the Geneva agreements were signed. On August 1 an armistice went into effect, signaling the end of the French Indochina war and the partition of Vietnam along the 17th parallel. The last French troops left South Vietnam in April 1956, upon request from President Ngô Đình Diệm.

Order of battle

French Forces
The G.M.s (Groupement Mobile) were designed as self-sustaining motorized regimental task force unit modelled on the U.S. Army's World War II regimental combat teams. The G.M.s typically consisted of three infantry battalions with one artillery battalion, along with elements of light armor or tanks, engineer, signal and medical assets, totaling 3,000-3,500 soldiers.

Units in the G.M.100 included:

Korea Regiment, consisting of the 1st and 2nd Korea Battalions formed from the elite veteran UN Bataillon de Corée.
The Bataillon de Marche of the 43rd Colonial Infantry Regiment.
 520th TDKQ (Tiểu-đoàn Khinh-quân), a light battalion from the Vietnamese National Army as part of An Khê garrison.
2nd Group of 10th Colonial Artillery Regiment.
 (less) 3rd Squadron of 5th "Royal Poland" Armored Cavalry Regiment – these were in reserve in Pleiku when GM 100 left An Khê

Việt Minh forces

The Việt Minh 96th Regiment included:

 40th Battalion (three infantry companies).
 79th Battalion (less) (two infantry companies).
 Two weapon companies (mortars, recoilless guns and bomb-launchers).

In popular culture
The opening scene of the movie We Were Soldiers – about the Ia Drang valley battle in Nov. 1965 – alludes to the destruction of Groupement Mobile 100. The US troops started out of An Khê as well, where they had established Camp Radcliff.

The battle is referred to in the novel Incident at Muc Wa and depicted, but not identified, in its movie adaptation Go Tell the Spartans.

References

Sources
 Fall, Bernard.,Street Without Joy: The French Debacle in Indochina. Stackpole Military History, 1961, 
 Summers Jr., Harry G. Historical Atlas of the Vietnam War. 1995 
 Kirk A. Luedeke, Death on the Highway: The Destruction of Groupement Mobile 100. Armor Magazine, January–February 2001, pp. 22–29.
 Từ Điện Biên Phủ đến Bắc Tây Nguyên. Trung đoàn 96 – trận tiêu diệt binh đoàn cơ động 100 của Pháp. NXB Quân đội Nhân dân, 1995.(From Dien Bien Phu to Northern Central Highland – The 96th Regiment and the battle which destroyed the French Groupement Mobile 100. People's Army Publishing House, 1995).

External links
 "Dossier" in French Marine Troops' unofficial website  (archive)
 THE VALLEY OF CROSSES - French and the Mang Yang Pass
 There was another Dien Bien Phu in 5th Military Region, Binh Dinh Newspaper (Có một Điện Biên Phủ ở Liên khu 5, Báo Bình Định)
 Vietnam Vignette: The French Groupement Mobile 100
 Derniers combats. 5 jours en enfer, ou la fin du GM 100 en Indochine. 24-28 juin 1954.
 INDOCHINE - Les Combats Oubliés GROUPEMENT MOBILE N° 100 - (G.M. 100)

Conflicts in 1954
History of Gia Lai Province
Mang Yang Pass
Mang Yang Pass
Mang Yang
1954 in French Indochina
1954 in Vietnam
June 1954 events in Asia